Epel Kapinias is a Papua New Guinea international rugby league footballer who plays as a  for the PNG Hunters in the Hostplus Cup.

Career
Kapinias made his international debut for Papua New Guinea in their 24-14 victory over Fiji in the 2022 Pacific Test.

References

External links
wynnum profile

1999 births
Living people
Papua New Guinea Hunters players
Papua New Guinea national rugby league team players
Papua New Guinean rugby league players
Rugby league props
Rugby league forwards
Wynnum Manly Seagulls players